WGSU (89.3 FM) is a college radio station and broadcasts from Geneseo, New York, United States. The station is located on the campus of the State University of New York at Geneseo. It is managed by the college's Department of Communication and staffed primarily by students.

In the early 1970s, the radio format, developed and executed by John Davlin, was known as a "continuum."

After Davlin's departure in 1976, WGSU continued to operate with a staff of student managers and programmers, providing the western New York region with a mix of rock, jazz, blues, World music (referred to at the time as "ethnic") and a smattering of classical music. A typical program during that period could include such artists as Pat Metheny, Bruce Cockburn, Karla Bonoff, Clifton Chenier, Thelonious Monk, Gentle Giant, Patti Smith. and Captain Beefheart.

WGSU is the home of Geneseo Ice Knights hockey, broadcasting all of their home and away games.

References

External links
 

GSU
GSU
Radio stations established in 1963
1963 establishments in New York (state)
State University of New York at Geneseo